Perambalur (Tamil: பெரம்பலூர்), is a town in Tamil Nadu, India.

Perambalur may also refer to:
 Perambalur district
 Perambalur division, is a revenue division.
 Perambalur taluk
 Perambalur block, is a revenue block.
 Perambalur (state assembly constituency)
 Perambalur (Lok Sabha constituency)
 Perambalur Buddhas, Buddhist images found in Thiyaganur.